Spies of Warsaw is a British television miniseries in which a Deuxième Bureau intelligence agent (spy) poses as a military attaché at the French embassy in Warsaw, and finds himself drawn into the outbreak of World War II.

The television series takes its name from its source, The Spies of Warsaw, a 2008 spy novel by Alan Furst.

Cast

Main
Main cast includes:  Some of the story is set in Nowy Benesov and Nowy Boleslawiec.
 David Tennant - Jean-François Mercier
 Janet Montgomery - Anna Skarbek
 Marcin Dorociński - Antoni Pakulski

Support
Support cast includes:
 Mirosław Zbrojewicz - Marek
 Ellie Haddington - Madame Dupin
 Burn Gorman - Jourdain
 Radosław Kaim - August Voss 
 Linda Bassett - Malka Rosen
 Allan Corduner - Viktor Rosen
 Anton Lesser - Doctor Lapp
 Piotr Baumann - Maxim Mostov
 Jan Pohl - Zoller 
 Richard Lintern - Colonel Lessard
 Julian Glover - General Beauvilliers 
 Fenella Woolgar - Lady Angela Hope 
 Richard Teverson - Roddy Fitzware
 Tuppence Middleton - Gabrielle 
 Tusse Silberg - Helena Skarbek 
 Gregg Lowe - Young German Soldier
 Grazyna Zielinska - Wladzia 
 Grzegorz Emanuel - Weasel 
 Nicholas Blane - Papa Heiniger 
 Dan Fredenburgh - Armand
 Julian Harries - Duff Cooper
 Ziggy Heath - Kazimir
 Bogdan Koca - Leszek
 Adam Godley - Julius Halbach
 Nicholas Murchie - Johannes Elter

Episodes
There are four episodes, which have also aired as a two-part series.

Production
The series was shot primarily in Krakow and Warsaw, Poland.

Broadcast and release
BBC America aired the series in April 2013.

Reception
Rotten Tomatoes rated the television series 64% from critics and 50% from average audience.

The Telegraph liked the series for many features:  appropriateness for "intergenerational shared viewing, never... too visually brutal, and the playing of the minor characters... was convincingly understated". The Guardian complained: "It should have been the perfect spy thriller. It had everything. Except tension".

New York Times deemed the series "true to the original in story and in spirit", Slate as an engrossing, if slow-moving drama" and the Boston Globe saying "a strangely bloodless affair".

The New York Times found the series "enjoyable, straightforward espionage tale without a lot of twists or extra layers".

References

External links
 
 

Espionage television series
Television series set in the 1930s
Fiction set in 1938
Fiction set in 1939
2013 British television series debuts
2013 British television series endings
2010s British drama television series
BBC television dramas
World War II television drama series
English-language television shows
British television miniseries